Abbots Bromley is a civil parish in the district of East Staffordshire, Staffordshire, England.  It contains 77 buildings that are recorded in the National Heritage List for England.  Of these, three are listed at Grade II*, the middle grade, and the others are at Grade II, the lowest grade.  The parish contains the village of Abbots Bromley and the surrounding countryside.  Most of the listed buildings are in the village, and most of these are houses, shops and cottages with associated structures, farmhouses and farm buildings, the earliest of which are timber framed or have timber framed cores.  Other listed buildings in the village include a church, a village cross, almshouses, public houses, a school chapel, and a war memorial.  In the surrounding area, most listed buildings are farmhouses and farm buildings, and the others include lodges, a monument, and mileposts.


Key

Buildings

Notes and references

Notes

Citations

Sources

Lists of listed buildings in Staffordshire